The boys' Greco-Roman 45 kg competition at the 2018 Summer Youth Olympics was held on 12 October, at the Asia Pavilion.

Competition format
As there were less than six wrestlers in a weight category, the pool phase will be run as a single group competing in a round-robin format.  Ranking within the groups is used to determine the pairings for the final phase.

Schedule 
All times are in local time (UTC-3).

Results
Legend
F — Won by fall

Group Stages

Group A

Group B

Finals

Final rankings

References

External links

Competition Sheet

Wrestling at the 2018 Summer Youth Olympics